Salehabad (also Romanized as Şāleḩābād; also known as Şoleḩābād and Solh Ābād) is a village in Kharturan Rural District, Beyarjomand District, Shahrud County, Semnan Province, Iran. At the 2006 census, its population was 195, in 55 families.

References 

Populated places in Shahrud County